Sassafras was an unincorporated community located in Mason County, West Virginia, United States. The Sassafras Post Office no longer exists.

References 

Unincorporated communities in West Virginia
Unincorporated communities in Mason County, West Virginia